The 2019–20 Segunda División B season was the 43rd since its establishment. Eighty teams participated, distributed in four groups of twenty clubs each. On 11 March 2020, the season of Segunda División B was suspended due to the coronavirus COVID-19 pandemic in Spain. 

On 6 May 2020, the Royal Spanish Football Federation announced the premature end of the league, revoking all relegations and planning an eventual promotion playoff to be played if possible. Also, the expansion of the league to five groups of 20 teams each for the 2020–21 season (due to promotion from the curtailed Tercera División groups being applied) was approved.

Overview before the season
80 teams joined the league, including four relegated from the 2018–19 Segunda División and 18 promoted from the 2018–19 Tercera División. The final groups were drawn in July 2019.

Relegated from Segunda División
Córdoba
Gimnàstic
Rayo Majadahonda
Reus (excluded due to its financial trouble)

Promoted from Tercera División'''

Alavés B
Algeciras
Cádiz B
Getafe B
Haro
La Nucía
Las Rozas
Llagostera
Marino Luanco
Mérida
Orihuela
Osasuna B
Peña Deportiva
Prat
Racing Ferrol
Villarrobledo
Villarrubia
Yeclano

Bought vacant places
Andorra

Group 1

Teams and locations

League table

Results

Top goalscorers

Top goalkeepers

Group 2

Teams and locations

League table

Results

Top goalscorers

Top goalkeepers

Group 3

Teams and locations

League table

Results

Top goalscorers

Top goalkeepers

Group 4

Teams and locations

League table

Results

Top goalscorers

Top goalkeepers

Copa Federación qualification
14 teams qualified for the 2020 Copa Federación: the 3 best teams in each group (excluding reserves) that did not qualify for the Copa del Rey and the 2 best-placed teams overall from the rest of teams, ranked by their points.

Best-placed teams
As two teams could qualify, only the best two teams in each group are shown.

Average attendances
This is a list of attendance data of the teams that give an official number. They include playoffs games:

|}
Notes:
1: Team played last season in Segunda División.
2: Team played last season in Tercera División.

References

External links
Royal Spanish Football Federation

 

 
2019-20
3
Spa
Spain